Joe Levins (born November 12, 1968 in Minneapolis) is an American former alpine skier who competed in the men's slalom at the 1992 Winter Olympics.

External links
 sports-reference.com
 

1968 births
Living people
American male alpine skiers
Olympic alpine skiers of the United States
Alpine skiers at the 1992 Winter Olympics
Skiers from Minneapolis
20th-century American people